Onesimus Dongsin Park (박동신 오네시모 Hanja 朴東信, born 1963) is a South Korean Anglican bishop. He is the Anglican bishop of the Diocese of Busan and the Primate of the Anglican Church of Korea. He was ordained to the priesthood in 1997 and became primate in 2017.

External links
Diocese of Busan
Anglican Church of Korea (Korean)

Living people
Anglican archbishops in Asia
South Korean Anglicans
South Korean clergy
1963 births
Anglican bishops of Busan
Anglican archbishops of Korea